Grigori Levitski (27 October 1852 Kharkiv – 26 October 1918 St. Petersburg) was a Russian astronomer.

In 1879 he graduated from St. Petersburg University. In 1880s he worked at Pulkovo Observatory.

1894-1908 he was the head of Tartu Observatory. 1901-1905 he was the president of Estonian Naturalists' Society. 1903-1905 he was the rector of Tartu University.

From 1915 he was the chairman of Russian Astronomical Society.

Works

 The Histories of the Observatories of Kharkov and Tartu (1894, 1899) 
 The Lexicon of Professors of Tartu University (1902-1903)

References

1852 births
1918 deaths
Russian astronomers
Scientists from Kharkiv
Academic staff of the University of Tartu
Rectors of the University of Tartu
Saint Petersburg State University alumni